Anselmo López is the name of:
 Anselmo López (musician) (1934–2016), Venezuelan musician
 Anselmo López (basketball) (1910–2004), Spanish basketball coach and administrator, member of the FIBA Hall of Fame